

Premierships (1/50)

The Sharks have only won one Grand Final.

Runners-up (3/50)

Minor Premierships (2/50)

Wooden Spoons (3/50)
 1967 Wooden Spoon
 1969 Wooden Spoon
 2014 Wooden Spoon

Finals Appearances (19/
, 2000, 2001, 2002, 2005, 2008, 2012, 2013, 2015, 2016

See also

References

External links

Cronulla-Sutherland Sharks
Rugby league trophies and awards
National Rugby League lists
Sydney-sport-related lists